María Dolores Fernández Pradera OAXS, MMT (29 August 1924 – 28 May 2018) was a Spanish melodic singer and actress, and one of the most famous voices in Spain and Latin America.

She started her career as an actress and during the 1950s she started singing professionally, eventually abandoning her career as an actress in the 1960s. She recorded more than 35 discs.

As a singer, she specialized in traditional Spanish and Latin American music: bolero, copla, ballad, ronda, vals, and folk music (Peruvian, Argentinian, Mexican, and Venezuelan). Her contralto voice had a deep resonance and sure melodic footing which must stem from classical training. Her pronunciation was pure Castilian, and her music pure Latin American. Her repertoire encompassed some of the most memorable melodies from Mexico, Peru, Venezuela and Chile and her interpretations close to genuine. She typically sang accompanied by guitars, requintos, and drums. She sang for close to 30 years with the same group, Los Gemelos, formed by twin brothers, Santiago and Julián López Hernández, until the death of Santiago in the early 1990s.

María Dolores Pradera died on 28 May 2018 at the age of 93.

Honours 
 Gold Medal of Merit in Labour (Kingdom of Spain, 27 April 2001).
 Dame Grand Cross of the Civil Order of Alfonso X, the Wise (Kingdom of Spain, 7 October 2016).

References

External links

1924 births
2018 deaths
Spanish women singers
Singers from Madrid
Latin Grammy Lifetime Achievement Award winners
Actresses from Madrid
Recipients of the Civil Order of Alfonso X, the Wise
Women in Latin music